John McCann (6 September 1867 – 1944) was a Scottish footballer who played in the Football League for Preston North End.

References

1867 births
1944 deaths
Scottish footballers
English Football League players
Association football forwards
Newcastle West End F.C. players
Celtic F.C. players
Hibernian F.C. players
Preston North End F.C. players
People from Uphall